Witold Silewicz (born 18 May 1921 in Rajsko, Poland - died 26 January 2007 in Vienna) – Polish-Austrian composer and Double bass player, probably best known for his instrumental arrangement of the Happy Birthday to You tune for Woodwind Quintet.

Biography

He was born in Rajsko nr. Oświęcim, on the estate of his maternal grandparents, the youngest of three children of Warsaw architect, Zdzisław Silewicz and his wife Stefania née Zwilling.
 
While still a child he was infected with Tuberculosis which affected his bones. As a result, he spent much time in treatment in sanatoria as was prescribed at the time, missing out on school. The illness left him lame in one leg for the rest of his life. When he was eight years old he lost his father who had died on a trip to Nice in 1930. In spite of his early trials, a striking musical talent became discernible. Through family connections on his mother's side, and at great risk after the outbreak of World War II, he was able to move to Vienna, then annexed to the Third Reich. In 1943 he was accepted by the Vienna Music Academy where he studied composition with Joseph Marx, conducting with Joseph Krips and Hans Swarowsky, a pupil of Richard Strauss. He earned his degree in 1951 after the earliest outing of his Adagio for Strings at the Vienna Musikverein already in 1949.

His double bass teachers from 1949 to 1955 were Johann Kramp and Otto Ruhm.

After completing his studies in Austria he travelled abroad where he developed his composition skills in France, Italy and Yugoslavia where he met his future Slovenian wife, Tatjana (1925-2011). After their marriage they settled in Vienna where they brought up two daughters. In 1962 Silewicz was taken on as a double bass player with the distinguished Tonkünstler Orchestra. He continued composing when his health allowed, greatly supported by his wife. He was an active member of the Polish Society of Musical Artists - abroad, i.e. musicians in exile, (Stowarzyszenie Polskich Artystów Muzyków - na obczyźnie, SPAM).

Witold Silewicz died in Vienna in January 2007 and was buried in the nearby Döbling Cemetery.

Works
 Two symphonies
 Concerts for solo instruments
 Chamber music
 Poème de la vie
 Ballet: Fanny Elssler – Frau u Mythos (1989)
 Kinderszenen
 Instrumental ensemble
 Geburtstagswünsche (Happy Birthday To You) for 2 clarinets, flute, oboe and bassoon
 Six Petites scènes d'enfants (1991)

Distinctions
 City of Vienna Awards  
 Awards by the Province of Niederösterreich (1981)

References

Bibliography
 Hartmut Krones. Ed.Die Ősterreichische Symphonien im 20 Jahrhundert. Vienna: Böhlau Verlag, 2005. .

External links
 

1921 births
2007 deaths
People from Oświęcim
Musicians from Vienna
Polish classical composers
Polish male classical composers
Austrian classical composers
Ballet composers
Polish conductors (music)
20th-century classical composers
Austrian classical double-bassists
Polish classical double-bassists
Polish emigrants to Austria
Male double-bassists
University of Music and Performing Arts Vienna alumni
Burials in Vienna
20th-century conductors (music)
20th-century double-bassists
20th-century male musicians